James Vanlandschoot (born 26 August 1978 in Bruges) is a Belgian former professional cyclist, who rode professionally between 2001 and 2015.

Major results

1999
 7th Ronde van Vlaanderen U23
2000
 1st Overall Tweedaagse van Gaverstreek
1st Stage 1
 1st Stage 3 Le Triptyque des Monts et Châteaux
2001
 10th Omloop van de Vlaamse Scheldeboorden
2002
 3rd Grand Prix Rudy Dhaenens
 6th Overall Circuit Franco-Belge
 9th Vlaamse Havenpijl
 10th Brussel–Ingooigem
2003
 2nd Scandinavian Open Road Race
 4th Omloop van de Vlaamse Scheldeboorden
 8th Omloop van het Waasland
 9th Vlaamse Havenpijl
 10th Overall Tour of Qatar
2004
 Vuelta a Mallorca
5th Trofeo Alcúdia
6th Trofeo Manacor
 5th Nokere Koerse
 7th Le Samyn
2005
 7th Omloop van het Waasland
2006
 7th Kampioenschap van Vlaanderen
 9th Classic Haribo
2007
 6th GP Briek Schotte
 8th Nokere Koerse
 9th Grote Prijs Stad Zottegem
2008
 3rd Grand Prix Pino Cerami
 7th Overall La Tropicale Amissa Bongo
2009
 3rd Nationale Sluitingsprijs
 7th Grote Prijs Stad Zottegem
 8th Profronde van Fryslan
 10th Scheldeprijs
2010
 5th Ronde van Overijssel
 8th Omloop der Kempen
 9th Schaal Sels
2011
 6th Cholet-Pays de Loire
 9th Dutch Food Valley Classic
 9th Grand Prix Pino Cerami
2013
 5th Omloop van het Waasland
 6th Grand Prix Pino Cerami
 10th De Kustpijl
2015
 8th Omloop van het Waasland

References

External links

1978 births
Living people
Belgian male cyclists
Sportspeople from Bruges
Cyclists from West Flanders